William Havelock was a cavalry officer.

William Havelock may also refer to:

William Henry Havelock, civil servant

See also
William Havelock Ramsden